La Tour d'Argent (English: The Silver Tower) is a historic restaurant in the 5th arrondissement of Paris, France. It is located at 15 Quai de la Tournelle. It has a rating of one star from the Guide Michelin.

History 
The restaurant claims that it was founded in 1582, and that it was frequented by Henri IV, but it offers no documentation to support these or other claims about its history. The Quai de la Tournelle, where the restaurant stands, was not paved until 1650, before which it was "a slope, often flooded and almost always made inaccessible by mud".

The restaurant does not appear in an 1824 list of "The principal restaurants, who are distinguished by the elegance of the decoration of their salons and by the number and the care taken with the dishes found there...".  
In 1852, a metals dealer occupied number 15 Quai de la Tournelle, and a hairdresser and wood dealer number 17.

Baedeker's 1860 guide to Paris describes the establishment's current location as "out of the way", while mentioning a restaurant associated with a low-cost "Hotel of the Tour d'Argent": "Between Notre Dame and the jardin des Plantes, on the Quai de la Tournelle, facing the bridge of this name, there is a little hotel and the restaurant Lecoq; Hôtel de la Tour d'argent, a bit out of the way, it is true, but well kept and cheap (room, 2 francs, beefsteak, 1 franc). Facing a swimming school, which has the advantage of not yet being encumbered and imprisoned by all the filth of Paris."

The restaurant was owned in the 1890s and 1900s by Frédéric Delair, who began the tradition of presenting a numbered certificate to each person who ate the restaurant's signature dish, pressed duck. A dinner was held there for the Wright Brothers in 1906. In 1912, the Terrail family bought the restaurant. It was operated first by André Terrail, then by his son Claude, who died in 2006 at the age of 88, and then by Claude's son André.

In 1984, a branch was opened in Tokyo, in the Hotel New Otani.

Since 1986, La Tour d'Argent has been a recipient of the Wine Spectator Grand Award.

Until 1996, the Guide Michelin awarded the restaurant three stars. The rating was reduced to two stars in 1996, and to one star in 2006.

Specialities 

Duck, especially the pressed duck, is the speciality (Canard à la presse, Caneton à la presse, Caneton Tour d'Argent, and recently renamed “Caneton de Frédéric Delair”). The restaurant raises its ducks on its own farm. Diners who order the duck receive a postcard with the bird's serial number, now well over 1 million. (Serial number #112,151 went to U.S. President Franklin Delano Roosevelt, #203,728 went to Marlene Dietrich, and #253,652 went to Charlie Chaplin).

The restaurant's wine cellar, guarded around the clock, contains more than 450,000 bottles whose value was estimated in 2009 at 25 million euros (£22.5 million). Some 15,000 wines are offered to diners on a 400-page list. The dining room has an excellent view of the river Seine and Notre Dame.

Cultural references 
In A Moveable Feast, Ernest Hemingway says that the Tour d'Argent rented some rooms and gave its lodgers discounts on the meals; also that a valet there used to sell English books left by the tenants.

Marcel Proust mentions the restaurant three times in his novel À la recherche du temps perdu (In Search of Lost Time). For example, the haughty Mme Verdurin sniffs "The Tour d'Argent is not nearly as good as they make out".

The restaurant inspired scenes in the 2007 Pixar movie Ratatouille, and received an "unexpected boost" from the film.

Four episodes of Fuji TV's Iron Chef had chefs from the Paris and Tokyo branches as challengers. From the Paris branch, Bernard Leprince faced Iron Chef Japanese Komei Nakamura twice, with either chef winning once (Leprince won the initial meeting on the French Special at Chateau de Brissac with salmon as the theme, while Nakamura won the rematch in Tokyo with duck as the theme). Meanwhile, from the Tokyo branch, Tadaaki Shimizu bested Iron Chef French Hiroyuki Sakai with lobster as the theme, while Dominique Corby was the 300th challenger and battled Iron Chef Chinese Chen Kenichi to a draw with foie gras as the regulation theme and asparagus as the overtime theme.

One episode of Root into Europe (British comedy starring George Cole) was filmed in the hotel, and the duck being pressed is shown and served to the actors. Claude Terrail appeared as himself.

The restaurant was visited in the Paris episode of Remarkable Places to Eat (presented by Fred Sirieix, with Michel Roux Jr. as the guide), featuring the duck being pressed at their table, and a visit to the wine cellar.

See also
 List of oldest companies

References

External links 
La Tour d'Argent official homepage
Step-by-step illustrated pressed duck at La Tour d'Argent
Tour d'argent in million-euro wine sale, Radio France Internationale in English

Restaurants in Paris
Michelin Guide starred restaurants in France
Buildings and structures in the 5th arrondissement of Paris